John Stampe Møller (16 February 1957 – 29 July 2012) was a Danish football player and coach.

He played 444 games (and scored 12 goals) for AGF Aarhus and 1 game for the Danish national football team. He later managed his former club AGF.

References

External links
  DBU Profile
  Obituary Politiken 29 July 2012

1957 births
2012 deaths
Danish men's footballers
Danish football managers
Aabyhøj IF players
Aarhus Gymnastikforening players
Aarhus Gymnastikforening managers
Association football defenders